Ilaria Bonomi (born 13 May 1995) is an Italian professional racing cyclist.

See also
 2014 Alé Cipollini season

References

External links
 

1995 births
Living people
Italian female cyclists
Cyclists from the Province of Verona